Dalmuir is a rural locality in Alberta, Canada that is northeast of Edmonton.

The community takes its name from Dalmuir, in Scotland.

References 

Localities in Thorhild County